Shell's Wonderful World of Golf was a televised series of golf matches which began in the 1960s. The program was sponsored by Shell Oil. It was a part of the tradition of "challenge matches" between pairs of professional golfers, which were the earliest form of professional golf competition, but have now been almost entirely replaced by large field tournaments. On a few occasions, three players competed (see table). No matches were staged between 1970 and 1994, when the show was restarted by Jack Nicklaus Productions and hosted by Gary Player.

Each contest was played as a stroke play match, rather than match play.

It began as a pre-recorded one-hour program on Sunday afternoons, and was notable for also including information about the host country for that week's show. It also included some of the conversations between the contestants between the shots. As such, it allowed the audience to feel they were part of a foursome traveling with the competitors and host, as opposed to being just a spectator in the gallery.

Matches through 2003

 (a) denotes amateur

References

Golf on television
Golf Channel original programming
1961 American television series debuts
1970 American television series endings
1994 American television series debuts
2000s American television series
2010s American television series
American television series revived after cancellation